Hieracium umbellatum (commonly called Hieracium canadense), the Canadian hawkweed, Canada hawkweed, narrowleaf hawkweed, or northern hawkweed, is a flowering plant in the family Asteraceae.

Distribution
It is native to most of the temperate parts of the northern hemisphere.

Description
Its pointed leaves have toothed margins, where the teeth can appear almost hooked. The flowers of the plant are yellow.

Infraspecific synonyms

There are many named infraspecific taxa of Hieracium umbellatum:

References

 
 
 

umbellatum
Flora of Asia
Flora of Europe
Flora of North America
Taxa named by Carl Linnaeus